Michael Andrew Gielen (born 2 June 1971) is a New Zealand prelate of the Roman Catholic Church. He has served as the eleventh Bishop of Christchurch, New Zealand since May 2022. Gielen was previously auxiliary Bishop of the Diocese of Auckland.

Early life and education 
Gielen was  born in Cambridge and raised in Tokoroa, the son of Henk and Maureen Gielen and the oldest of six siblings. He received his secondary education at Forest View High School, Tokoroa. After studying at Holy Cross Seminary (then located in Mosgiel), he was ordained as a priest in 1997 in Tokoroa by Bishop Max Mariu, SM, Auxiliary Bishop of Hamilton, New Zealand, the first Maori Catholic bishop. Gielen was the only priest ever ordained by Bishop Mariu. He worked in parish ministry in the Hamilton diocese serving in parishes in the East Coast, Waikato, North Waikato and Raglan. He studied at the Franciscan University of Steubenville and at the Gregorian University in Rome. From 2014 until 2019, he served as director of formation at Holy Cross Seminary in Auckland.

Episcopacy 
On 6 January 2020, Gielen was appointed auxiliary bishop of Auckland by Pope Francis as the titular bishop of Abbir Maius. He was ordained bishop at the Vodafone Event Centre, Manukau, Auckland on Saturday 7 March 2020 in the presence of 3,000 people. The principal consecrator was Bishop Patrick James Dunn and the principal co-consecrators were Bishop Stephen Lowe and Bishop Peter Cullinane The deacon at the ordination Mass was Deacon Henk Gielen of Papamoa, Michael Gielen's father. Other bishops participating included Cardinal John Dew, Bishop Michael Dooley, Bishop Colin Campbell, Bishop Basil Meeking, Bishop Owen Dolan, Bishop Denis Browne and Bishop Richard Umbers. The papal bull of appointment was read, on behalf of the Apostolic Nuncio, Archbishop Novatus Rugambwa, by Monsignor Edward Karaan, Deputy Head of Mission and First Secretary at the Apostolic Nunciature in Wellington.
On 21 May 2022, Pope Francis appointed Gielen as the 11th Bishop of Christchurch. He is set to be installed as bishop in July.

Personal life 
Gielen is a keen cyclist. In 2015, he and seven seminarians of Holy Cross Seminary cycled for 33 days from Cape Reinga at the northern end of the North Island to Bluff on the southern coast of the South Island to promote vocations for the priesthood. He also enjoys participating in rugby union, cricket and golf.

See also
List of New Zealand Catholic bishops
List of New Zealand religious leaders
Christianity in New Zealand

References

External links

 OCEANIA/NEW ZEALAND – "Appointment of the auxiliary Bishop of Auckland", Agenzia Fides, 7 January 2020 (Retrieved 14 January 2020).

 

Living people
1971 births
Religious leaders from Auckland
21st-century Roman Catholic bishops in New Zealand
Holy Cross College, New Zealand alumni
Franciscan University of Steubenville alumni
Pontifical Gregorian University alumni
Roman Catholic bishops of Auckland
People educated at Forest View High School, Tokoroa